Stefan Momirov (born 18 December 1999) is a Serbian professional basketball player for Río Breogán of the Spanish Liga ACB.

Early career 
Momirov started to play basketball for the youth system of Crvena zvezda. He played the Euroleague Basketball Next Generation Tournaments for the Crvena zvezda U18 (2015–2017).

Professional career 
Prior to the 2017–18 season, he was loaned to FMP from Belgrade. He appeared in two ABA League First Division games with FMP. 
In December 2017, Momirov signed a multi-year contract with FMP and went on a loan to his hometown-based team Vršac for the rest of the 2017–18 season In March 2020, he parted ways with FMP. In May 2020, after the COVID-19 pandemic ban, he joined a training camp of Partizan.

On 28 August 2020, Momirov signed a two-year contract for Mega Bemax. 

In July 2021, he signed with the Greek club Kolossos Rodou. In 26 games, he averaged 6.6 points, 3.6 rebounds, 1.1 assists and 1 steal, playing around 27 minutes per contest.

National team career
Momirov was a member of the Serbian U-18 national basketball team that won the gold medal at the 2017 FIBA Europe Under-18 Championship. Over seven tournament games, he averaged 7.1 points, 3.1 rebounds, and 2.6 assists per game. He also participated at the 2016 FIBA Europe Under-18 Championship. Momirov was a member of the Serbian under-20 team that finished 15th at the 2019 FIBA U20 European Championship in Tel Aviv, Israel. Over seven tournament games, he averaged 8.4 points, 7.9 rebounds, and 3.6 assists per game.

Personal life 
Momirov is a son of basketball players Snežana Pavlović and Jovan Momirov. His mother is a former Serbian professional basketball player who played for Radnički Kragujevac, Hemofarm Vršac, MiZo-Pécsi VSK and represented FR Yugoslavia national team internationally. She was a national team member at the EuroBasket Women 1995. His father played for Vršac and Profikolor during his career.

References

External links 
 Profile at eurobasket.com
 Profile at realgm.com

1999 births
Living people
20th-century Serbian people
21st-century Serbian people
ABA League players
Basketball League of Serbia players
CB Breogán players
Competitors at the 2022 Mediterranean Games
Guards (basketball)
KK Crvena zvezda youth players
KK FMP players
KK Mega Basket players
KK Vršac players
Kolossos Rodou B.C. players
Mediterranean Games medalists in basketball
Mediterranean Games silver medalists for Serbia
Serbian expatriate basketball people in Greece
Serbian expatriate basketball people in Spain
Serbian men's basketball players
People from Vršac